Lacey Kirk Williams (1871, Eufaula, Alabama-1940) was an African-American who became President of the National Baptist Convention. He was appointed Vice President to the World Baptist Alliance in 1928. He died in an aeroplane crash in 1940.

In 1919 he was appointed to the Chicago Commission on Race Relations.

References

1871 births
1940 deaths
African-American Baptist ministers
20th-century African-American people